Kedgaon may refer to one of the following places:

Kedgaon, Ahmednagar district, Maharashtra State, India
Kedgaon, Pune district,  Maharashtra State
Kedgaon, Solapur district, Maharashtra State